

The Lister Medal is an award presented by the Royal College of Surgeons of England in recognition of contributions to surgical science. It is named after the English surgeon Joseph Lister (1827-1912), whose work on antiseptics established the basis of modern sterile surgery.

The medal has its origins in the Lister Memorial Fund, started by the Royal Society, which was raised by public subscription after Lister's death, with the object of creating a lasting mark of respect to his memory. In 1920, the Royal College of Surgeons of England became the trustees and administrators of the fund. They were entrusted with the task of awarding a monetary prize and a bronze medal (gold since 1984) every three years, irrespective of nationality, to those who had made outstanding contributions to surgical science. The triennial award is decided by a committee representing the Royal Society, the Royal College of Surgeons of England, the Royal College of Surgeons in Ireland, the University of Edinburgh, and the University of Glasgow.

The Lister Medal, although it is not always awarded to a surgeon, is one of the most prestigious honours a surgeon can receive. The obverse of the medal consists of a representation of a bust of Lord Lister. The reverse side has the recipient's name across centre, and around the edge of the medal is text naming the award along with the dedication:

On the occasion of the award, the medallist delivers the Lister Oration (sometimes called the "Lister Memorial Lecture"). The first award was announced in 1924, with the presentation and the lecture taking place the following year. The most recent award was made in 2015, with a total of 27 people having received the medal to date.

Medallists

Notes

See also

 List of medicine awards

References

External links
From mourning to scientific legacy: commemorating Lister in London and Scotland by Marguerite Wright Dupree (Notes Rec R Soc Lond. 2013 Sep 20; 67(3): 261–280)

British awards
Medicine awards